Mount Kinet is a large, rounded mountain,  high, on the south side of upper Meander Glacier,  southeast of Hobbie Ridge, in the Mountaineer Range of Victoria Land, Antarctica. It was mapped by the United States Geological Survey from surveys and U.S. Navy air photos, 1960–64, and was named by the Advisory Committee on Antarctic Names for Urbain J. Kinet, a biologist at McMurdo Station, 1965–66.

References

External links
Urbain J. Kinet, 1909--1989, biographical sketch

Mountains of Victoria Land
Borchgrevink Coast